Bull Island is one of the Elizabeth Islands between Nonamesset Island and Uncatena Island, it separates Hadley Harbor from Inner Harbor. Bull Island is located in Dukes County, Massachusetts in the Town of Gosnold.

References

Gosnold, Massachusetts
Coastal islands of Massachusetts
Elizabeth Islands
Islands of Dukes County, Massachusetts